The Jordan women's national football team is the official women's national football team of the country of Jordan. The team was established in 2005, and is controlled by the Jordan Football Association (JFA), the governing body for football in Jordan.

Whilst the team has yet to qualify for the FIFA Women's World Cup, they took part in the AFC Women's Asian Cup in 2014 and 2018, failing to qualify past the group stage on both occasions. Jordan are regulars at the WAFF Women's Championship, and have won a record five titles.

History 
Prince Ali Bin Hussein directly supports the team and was instrumental in lifting FIFA's ban on headscarves in 2018.

Jordan hosted the 2018 Women's Asian Cup, becoming the first Arab country to host the tournament. It also hosted the 2017 Women's U-17 World Cup.

Results and fixtures

The following is a list of match results in the last 12 months, as well as any future matches that have been scheduled.

 Legend

2022

2023

Fixtures and results (Jordan) – Soccerway.com

Coaching staff

Current coaching staff

Manager history

 Maher Abu Hantash (2005–2017)
 Issa Al-Turk (2006)
 Hester Jannet (2010–2011)
 Okiyama Masahiko (2013–2014)
 Khader Eid (2015)
 Michael Dickey (2017–2018)
 Azzedine Chih (2018–2019)
 David Nascimento (2021–)

Players

Current squad
The following players were called up for the 2022 WAFF Women's Championship in September 2022.

Caps and goals as of 12 April 2021, after the match against .

Recent call-ups
The following players have been called up to the squad in the past 12 months.

Previous squads

AFC Women's Asian Cup
2014 AFC Women's Asian Cup squad
2018 AFC Women's Asian Cup squad

Individual records 

*Active players in bold, statistics as of 25 August 2021.

Most capped players

Top goalscorers

Competitive record

FIFA Women's World Cup

*Draws include knockout matches decided on penalty kicks.

Olympic Games

*Draws include knockout matches decided on penalty kicks.

AFC Women's Asian Cup

*Draws include knockout matches decided on penalty kicks.

Asian Games

WAFF Women's Championship

*Draws include knockout matches decided on penalty kicks.

AFF Women's Championship

Turkish Women's Cup

Other tournaments

FIFA world rankings

 Best Ranking   Best Mover   Worst Ranking   Worst Mover

Head-to-head record 
The following table shows Jordan's all-time international record, correct as of 24 June 2018.

Note: In 2011, The Iranian government refused to allow its female players to remove the hijab when playing, in violation of FIFA policy. Therefore, on 3 July 2011, Jordan was awarded a 3–0 over Iran.

See also

Sport in Jordan
Football in Jordan
Women's football in Jordan
Women's football
Jordan women's national under-20 football team
Jordan women's national under-17 football team
Jordan men's national football team

References

External links
 Official website
 FIFA profile

َArabic women's national association football teams
 
National
Asian women's national association football teams